This is a list of islands in Europe ordered by population. Ten islands on the list are not geographically in Europe, but listed since they politically belong. The list is not complete.

European Islands

See also
 List of European islands by area
 List of islands by population

Notes
 Population figures of Alderney, Sark and Herm are deducted from the population of Bailiwick of Guernsey. These three islands are part of the Bailiwick of Guernsey, but are separate islands.
 It could be argued that some islands of Saint Petersburg, most notably Vasilievsky Island and Kamenny Island, should be added. But it is hard to find any statistics on them which is not in Russian.
 It is hard to find statistics on Île de la Cité and Île Saint-Louis, the two islands in the Seine in Paris, or to decide whether they belong to the list.
 Population figures of some small islands of Iceland (f.ex Heimaey are deducted from the population of the republic of Iceland.
 Madeira Island of Portugal is not included, as it is not a European island.
 Canary Islands of Spain are likewise not included, as they are not European islands either.
 To be precise, Venice and Chioggia (two distinct cities, the first one at the centre, the second one at the southern end of the Venice Lagoon) are not two islands themselves, but two groups of larger and smaller lagoon islands, very near one to another but separated by larger and smaller lagoon channels. As for Paris and Saint Petersburg, it would be difficult to find statistics about the population of every single island.
 The status of Södertörn and Södermalm as islands has been disputed in earlier Wikipedia articles; the publication of includes a changed definition of an "island" to be used - which clarifies the question, at least in official Swedish statistics.
 Population figures (as of 31 December 2013) of Swedish islands except Södermalm and Kungsholmen as published by.
 Population figures for Swedish island Södermalm does not include the population of the smaller, nearby islands Reimersholme and Långholmen, neither is the population of Hammarby Sjöstad. 
 Population figures (as of 31 December 2013) of Swedish islands Södermalm and Kungsholmen are calculated from.

References

Islands by population
European islands by population

Islands
European islands